Singaporemma is a genus of Asian araneomorph spiders in the family Tetrablemmidae that was first described by W. A. Shear in 1978.

Species
 it contains eight species, found in Asia:
Singaporemma adjacens Lehtinen, 1981 – Vietnam
Singaporemma banxiaoense Lin & Li, 2014 – China
Singaporemma bifurcatum Lin & Li, 2010 – China
Singaporemma halongense Lehtinen, 1981 – Vietnam
Singaporemma lenachanae Lin & Li, 2017 – Singapore
Singaporemma singulare Shear, 1978 (type) – Singapore
Singaporemma takense Yan & Lin, 2018 – Thailand
Singaporemma wulongense Lin & Li, 2014 – China

See also
 List of Tetrablemmidae species

References

Araneomorphae genera
Spiders of Asia
Tetrablemmidae